Anil K. Bera (born 1955) is an Indian-American econometrician. He is Professor of Economics at University of Illinois at Urbana–Champaign's Department of Economics.  He is most noted for his work with Carlos Jarque on the Jarque–Bera test.

Early life
Anil K. Bera was born in a remote village Paschimchak, West Bengal, India. His father was a doctor who charged no formal fees from his patients and relied on voluntary contributions. Bera was living with his seven brothers and two sisters at that time. His mother never went to school but she appreciated and understood the importance of education.  She always made sure that Bera never missed a day of school or arrived late.

Education and career
Bera attended his village schools, Narendrapur Ramkrishna Mission Residential College, and the Indian Statistical Institute, Calcutta and Delhi. In 1971, he was admitted to Ramkrishna Mission Residential College, Narendrapur in 1971 to do an Honors in Statistics with Physics and Mathematics as auxiliary subjects.
Bera received a B.Sc. from Calcutta University in 1975 in Statistics (First Class), a master's degree from Indian Statistical Institute in 1977 in Econometrics and Planning (First Class), and a Ph.D. in 1983 from Australian National University (Phd Aspects of Econometric Modeling). He was also a CORE Fellow at the Université Catholique de Louvain, Belgium.
Bera is named to the List of Teachers Rated as Excellent almost every semester he teaches. He received the Economics Graduate Students’ Organization (EGSO) Award for Excellence in Graduate Teaching eight times since 1989, the College of Commerce Alumni Association Outstanding Teaching Award for Graduate Teaching in 1991 and Honorable Mention of the Campus Award for Excellence in Graduate and Professional Teaching in 2005. He visits his hometown regularly, and is currently engaged in some development projects, such as building a Free Library and a Primary School building. Established and running a Free Learning Center for needy children in village Paschimchak (West Midnapore, India) under A. Bera Center for Development and Education (ABCDE), since January 2020. ABCDE now has 80 students and 10 teachers.

Academic honors 
Keynote Speaker, International Conference on Empirical Economics and Social Sciences (ICEESS), December 12 – 13, 2020, Bandırma Onyedi Eylül University, Turkey.
Diamond Jubilee Commemorative Webinar Lecture, RKMR College, October 16, 2020, Narendrapur India.
Keynote Speaker, International Seminar on Contemporary Issues of Development in the Backward Region of India, February 17 – 18, 2020, Department of Economics, Vidyasagar University, Midnapore, India.
Public Lecture, 6th Professor Suresh Tendulkar Memorial Lecture, January 29, Symbiosis School of Economics (SSE), Pune, India.
Invited speaker, International Conference on Strategic Management, Decision Theory and Data Science, January 4 – 6, 2020, Council of Scientific and Industrial Research (CSIR), Glass and Ceramic Research Institute, Calcutta, India.
Keynote Speaker, International Conference on Recent Applications of Econometrics in Business and Social Sciences, January 13, 2020, Department of Economics, Pingla College, West Bengal, India
Invited speaker, Special Session on Spatial Statistics, 2019 International Indian Statistical Association (IISA) Conference, December 26 – 30, 2019, Indian Institute of Technology (IIT), Bombay, India.
Invited speaker, C.R. Rao Honorary Session, 2019 International Indian  Statistical Association (IISA) Conference, December 26 – 30, 2019, Indian Institute of Technology (IIT), Bombay, India.
Public Lecture, Professor T.D. Dwivedi Memorial Lecture, Department of Statistics, Concordia University, Canada, October 2019.
Invited speaker, 4th workshop on Goodness-of-Fit, Change-Point and Related Problems(GOFCP2019), University of Trento, Italy, September 2019,. 
Keynote speaker, Workshop RED in Mexico: Challenges of a New Era, Universidad Panamericana and CIDE – RC, Aguascalientes, AGS, Mexico, June 2019.
Keynote speaker, The 5th National Scientific Conference on Spatial Econometrics and Regional Economic Analysis, Lodz, Poland, June 2018.  
Invited speaker, International Conference in Statistics and Probability to Commemorate 125th birth Anniversary of Prasanta Chandra Mahalanobis (PCM 125), Indian Statistical Institute, Kolkata, India, January 2018.
Keynote speaker, The XVIII International Symposium on Econometrics Operations Research and Statistics, Black Sea Technical University, Trabzon, Turkey, October, 2017.
Invited speaker, The  World Conference of the Spatial Econometrics Association, Singapore Management University (SMU), Singapore, June, 2017.
Keynote speaker, International Conference on Econometrics, Turkish Economic Association, Bodrum, Turkey, October 2016.
Keynote speaker, European Real Estate Society (ERES) 22nd Annual Conference, Istanbul, Turkey, June 2015.
Keynote speaker, The 4th International Conference in Econometrics and Forecasting, Dongbei University of Finance and Economics, Dalian, China, July 2014.
Keynote speaker, The 3rd National Scientific Conference on Spatial Econometrics and Regional Economic Analysis, Lodz, Poland, June 2014.
Keynote speaker, The 2nd National Scientific Conference on Spatial Econometrics and Regional Economic Analysis, Lodz, Poland, June 2012.
Keynote speaker, Tsinghua International Conference in Econometrics, Beijing, China, May 2012.
Invited speaker, Advances in Econometrics Conference in Honor of Jerry Hausman, Louisiana State University, Baton Rouge, February 2012. 
Keynote speaker, 12th International Symposium on Econometrics, Operations Research and Statistics, Denizli, Turkey, June 2011.
Keynote speaker, IVth World Conference of the Spatial Econometrics Association, Chicago, June 2010. 
Keynote speaker, The 1st National Scientific Conference on Spatial Econometrics and Regional Economic Analysis, Lodz, Poland, June 2010.
Fellow, spatial Econometrics Association, 2007-current.
Honorable mention, Campus Award for Excellence in Graduate and Professional Teaching, 2005.
Economics Graduate Students’ Organization Award for Excellence in Graduate Teaching: 2003, 2004, 2008.
Lansdowne Visitor, University of Victoria, Canada, March 2000.
Japan Society for the Promotion of Science Fellowship, 1995.
College of Commerce Alumni Association Outstanding Teaching Award for Graduate Teaching, 1991.

Selected publications 
Books
Bera, Anil K., Ivliev, S. and Lillo, F. (2015) 'Financial Econometrics and Empirical Market Microstructure'. Springer International Publishing, 284 pages.
Bera, Anil K. and Mukerjee, R. (2001)  'Rao’s Score Test and Its Applications'. Journal of Statistical Planning and Inference, 97, 200 pages.

Papers

 Bera, Anil K; Taspinar, S.; Dogan, O. ; & Chae, J. "Bayesian Inference in Spatial Stochastic Volatility Models with an Application to House Price Returns in Chicago”, Oxford Bulletin of Statistics & Economics, 2021, forthcoming
 Bera, Anil K; Taspinar, S.; & Dogan, O. “A Bayesian Robust Chi-squared Test for Testing Simple Hypotheses” , Journal of Econometrics, 2021, forthcoming.
 Bera, Anil K; Taspinar, S.; & Dogan, O. “Asymptotic Variance of Test Statistics in the ML and QML Frame works” , Journal of Statistical Theory and Practice, 2021, forthcoming.
 Doğan, O., Taşpınar, S. & Bera, A.K.  “Bayesian Estimation of Stochastic Tail Index from High-Frequency Financial Data” , Empirical Economics, 2021, forthcoming.

 Bera, A. K.; & Ghosh, P. (2020). “Glimpses from the Life and Work of Dr. C.R. Rao: A Living Legend in Statistics” , Bhāvanā The Mathematics Magazine, 2020, 4, pp. 1–11. Also reprinted in Centennial Volume of C.R. Rao, Indian Statistical Institute and in A Tribute to the Legend of Professor C.R. Rao, Chapter 7, 2020, Springer Nature.
 Montes – Rojas, G.; Bera, A. K.; Sosa – Escudero, W. ; & Alego, J. (2020). "Tests for Nonlinear Restrictions under Local Misspecifications with an Application to  Testing Rational Expectation Hypothesis” , The Econometrics Journal
 Arbia, G.; Bera, A. K.; Doğan, O.; & Taşpınar, S. (2020). "Testing Impact Measures in Spatial Autoregressive Models", International Regional Science Review, 43(1–2), 40–75.
 Bera, Anil K.; Billas, Y.; Dogan, O.; Taspinar, S.; & Yoon, M. (2020). “Adjustment of Rao’s Score Test for Distributional and Local Parametric Misspecifications” , Journal of Econometrics Method. 9, pp. 1–29.
 Bera, A. K.; Uyar, U.; & Kangalli Uyar, S. G. (2019). "Analysis of the five-factor asset pricing model with wavelet multiscaling approach". Quarterly Review of Economics and Finance. 
 Bera, A.K.; Dogan, O.; & Taspinar, S.; & Leiluo, Y. (2019). "Robust LM tests for spatial dynamic panel data models", Regional Science and Urban Economics. 
 Bera, A. K.; & Kangalli Uyar, S. G. (2019). "Local and Global Determinants of Office Rents in Istanbul: The Mixed Geographically Weighted Regression Approach” , Journal of European Real Estate Research, 12, pp. 227–249
 Bera, A.K.; Dogan, O.; & Taspinar, S. (2019). "Heteroskedasticity-Consistent Covariance Matrix Estimators for GMME of Spatial Autoregressive Models", Spatial Economic Analysis, 14, pp. 241–268
 Bera, A.K.; Dogan, O.; & Taspinar, S. (2019). "Testing Spatial Dependence in Spatial Models with Endogenous Weights Matrices" , Journal of Econometric Methods, 8, pp. 1–33.
Bera, Anil K. and Park, S. (2018)."Information Theoretic Approaches to Density Estimation with an Application to the U.S. personal Income Data". Journal of Income Inequality. 16 (4): 461–486. doi:10.1007/s10888-018-9377-y.
Bera, Anil K. and Kao, S. (2018). "Testing spatial regression models under nonregular conditions". Empirical Economics. 55 (1): 85–111. doi:10.1007/s00181-018-1455-2.
Bera, Anil K.; Dogan, O.; Taspinar, S. (2018). "Simple Tests for Endogeneity of Spatial Weight Matrices". Regional Science and Urban Economics, pp. 130–142.
Bera, Anil K.; Dogan, O.; Taspinar, S. (2018). "Simple Test for Social Interaction Models with Network Structures". Spatial Economic Analysis. 13: 212-246. doi:10.1080/17421772.2017.1374550
Bera, Anil K.; Alejo, J.; Galvo, A.; Montes Rojas, G. and Xiao, Z. (2018). "Tests for Normality Based on the Quantile-mean Covariance".The Stata Journal. 16 (4): 1039–1057. doi:10.1177/1536867x1601600412.
Bera, Anil K.; Taspinar S.; Dogan, O. (2017). "GMM Gradient Tests for Spatial Dynamic Panel Data Models". Regional Science and Urban Economics, 65: 65-88. 
Bera, Anil K. and Lu, C. (2017). "Prasanta Chandra Mahalanobis: A Renaissance Man and Father of Statistics in India". Bhavana: A Publication of the Indian Mathematics Consortium, pp. 1–17.
Bera, Anil K.; Er, S.; Fidan-Keçeci, N. (2017). "Spatial Dependence in Financial Data: Importance of the Weight Matrix". Arthaniti-Journal of Economic Theory and Practice. 15 (2): 29–42. doi:10.1177/0976747920160203
Bera, Anil K.; Montes-Rojas, G.; Sosa-Escudero, W. (2016). "Robustness of Validity and Efficiency of Rao’s Score Tests Under Local Misspecification", Communications in Statistics - Theory and Methods.
Bera, Anil K.; Galvo, A.; Wang, L.; Xiao, Z. (2016). "A New Characterization of the Normal Distribution and Test for Normality". Econometric Theory. 32: 1216–1252. doi:10.1017/S026646661500016X
Bera, Anil K.; Galvo, A.; Montes Rojas, G.; Park, S. (2016). "Which Quantile is Most Informative? Maximum Likelihood, Maximum Entropy and Quantile Regression". Journal of Econometric Methods. doi:10.2139/ssrn.1695619
Bera, Anil K. and Premaratne, G. (2015). "Adjusting the Tests for Skewness and Kurtosis for Distributional Misspecifications". Communications in Statistics, Simulation and Computation, 46: 1-27. doi:10.1080/03610918.2014.988254
Bera, Anil K. and Sen, M. (2014). "The Improbable Nature of Implied Correlation Matrix of Spatial Autoregressive Model". Regional Statistics, pp. 3–15.

Bera, Anil K., Ghosh, J.K. and Maiti, P. (2011). History of the Indian Statistical Institute – Numbers and Beyond (1931-1947), Science and Modern India: An Industrial History: 1784-1947, pp. 1013–1056.

Bera, Anil K. and Premaratne, G. (2005). 'A Test for Symmetry with Leptokurtic Financial Data'. Journal of Financial Econometrics, pp. 169–187.
Bera, Anil K. and Park, S. (2004). Financial Data Analysis Using Maximum Entropy Approach, Proceedings of the International Statistical Conference, pp. 89–105.

Bera, Anil K., Sosa-Escudero, W. and Yoon, M. (2003). 'Test for Error Component Model in the Presence of Local Misspecification'. Recent Development in the Econometrics of Panel Data.

Bera, Anil K. and Ghosh, A. (2002). 'Neyman’s Smooth Test and Its Applications in Econometrics'. Handbook of Applied Econometrics and Statistical Inference, pp. 177–230.
Bera, Anil K. and Mallick, N.C. (2002). 'Information Matrix Tests for the Composed Error Frontier Model'. Advances on Methodological and Applied Aspects of Probability and Statistics, pp. 575–596.
Bera, Anil K. and Sosa-Escudero, W. (2001). 'Specification Tests for Linear Panel Data Models'. Stata Technical Bulletin, STB-61, pp. 18–21.

Bera, Anil K. and Premaratne, G. (2001). 'General Hypothesis Testing'. A Companion to Theoretical Econometrics, pp. 38–61.
Bera, Anil K. (2000). 'Hypothesis Testing in the 20th Century with a Special Reference to Testing with Misspecified Models'. Statistics for the 21st Century:  Methodologies for Applications of the Future, pp. 33–92.

Bera, Anil K. and Higgins, M.L. (1998). 'A Survey of ARCH Models'. Volatility:  New Techniques for Pricing Derivatives and Managing Financial Portfolios, pp. 23–58.
Bera, Anil K. and Anselin, L. (1998). 'Spatial Dependence in Linear Regression Models with an Introduction to Spatial Econometrics'. The Handbook of Applied Economic Statistics, pp. 237–289.
Bera, Anil K., Ra, S. and Sarkar, N. (1998). Hypothesis Testing for Some Nonregular Cases in Econometrics, Econometrics:  Theory and Practice, pp. 319–351.

Bera, Anil K. and Higgins, M.L. (1994). 'ARCH Models:  Properties Estimation and Testing'. Survey in Econometrics, pp. 215–272.
Bera, Anil K., Park, H. and Bubnys, E. (1993). The ARCH Effects and Efficient Estimation of Hedge Ratios for Stock Index Futures, Advances in Futures and Options Research, pp. 313–328.

Bera, Anil K. and Higgins, M.L. (1993). 'ARCH Models:  Properties, Estimation and Testing'. Journal of Economic Surveys, 7, pp. 305–366.

Bera, Anil K. and Higgins, M.L. (1992). 'A Class of Nonlinear ARCH Models'. International Economic Review, 33, pp. 137–158.
Bera, Anil K. and Machado, J. (1992). 'Bayesian Estimation of Systematic Risk Using Hierarchical and Nonnormal Priors'. Readings in Econometrics in Honor of George Judge, pp. 143–157.

Jarque, C. M. and Bera, Anil K. (1987). 'Test for Normality of Observations and Regression Residuals'. International Statistical Review, 55, pp. 163–172.

Bera, Anil K., Jarque, C.M. and Lee, L.F. (1984). Testing for the Normality Assumption in Limited Dependent Variable Models, International Economic Review, 25, pp. 563–578.

Bera, Anil K. and Jarque, C.M. (1982). 'Model Specification Tests:  A Simultaneous Approach'. Journal of Econometrics, 20, pp. 59–82.

Community 

Community Services in U.S.A
 Delivered Commencement Address, University High, 2010. 
 Parent Faculty Organization (PFO) Board Member, University High School, 2008-2009, 2009-2010.
 Invited for a talk, “A Century of Micro-banking:  1905-2006:  From Tagore to Yunus,” at the Unitarian-Universalist Church, Urbana, November 2006.  The talk helped raising funds for the Foundation for International Community Assistance (FINCA), 2007. 
 Principal Organizer, Tagore Festival, Urbana, 2005, 2006.
 Member of the Tagore Festival Committee, Urbana, 2003, 2004. 
 Vice President, Board of Directors, Robeson Meadow Homeowners Association, Champaign, Illinois, 1995-1996.
 President, East-Central Illinois Bengali Association, 1994-1995.
 Member of the Board of Directors, Robeson Meadow Homeowners Association, Champaign, Illinois, 1993-1995.
 Founding Member and Secretary-Treasurer of the East-Central Illinois Bengali Association, 1987-1989.
 Secretary-Treasurer of the Indian Cultural Society of Urbana-Champaign, 1986.

Community Services in India
 Established and running a Free Learning Center for needy children in my village Paschimchak (West Midnapore, India) under A. Bera Center for Development and Education (ABCDE), since January 2020.
 Built classrooms for the Paschimchak Primary School, Midnapore, 2003-2005.
 Built Dr. H.P. Bera Memoria Free Library in Jalchak, Midnapore, India, May 2004.

References 

7. Bera, Anil K. "Paschimchak to Champaign: A Long Journey". Mimeo.

External links 
 University of Illinois at Urbana-Champaign: Bera, Anil K homepage (Accessed July 2011)

20th-century Indian economists
Living people
1955 births
Econometricians
University of Calcutta alumni
University of Illinois Urbana-Champaign faculty